American rapper Isaiah Rashad has released three studio albums, two EPs, eight singles and twelve music videos.

Studio albums

EPs

Singles

As lead artist

As featured artist

Other charted and certified songs

Guest appearances

Music videos

As lead artist

As featured artist

Notes

References

External links
 

Discographies of American artists
Hip hop discographies